Igor Šoltes (born August 22, 1964) is a Slovenian lawyer and politician.

Career 
Šoltes served as the President of the Court of Auditors of Slovenia from 2004 to 2013. In 2008, he received his PhD at the Faculty of Social Studies at the University of Ljubljana. In January 2014, Šoltes was seen as a possible candidate for minister of health; however, he decided to refuse the offer from Prime Minister Alenka Bratušek due to lack of political support in the coalition.

Before the 2014 European Parliament election, Šoltes formed a ticket named Verjamem (meaning "I believe" in Slovene) which won 10.45% of the vote, securing one seat in the European Parliament (for Šoltes). Following the election, Šoltes announced a plan to transform the ticket into a full political party at a congress that would take place on 4 June 2014 in order for the party to enter the parliamentary election in July 2014. After receiving 6,800 votes in the parliamentary election, he resigned as president of Verjamem.

Personal life 
Šoltes is the grandson of the late Yugoslav politician and economist Edvard Kardelj.

See also 

 List of members of the European Parliament for Slovenia, 2014–19

References

1964 births
Living people
Lawyers from Ljubljana
MEPs for Slovenia 2014–2019
University of Ljubljana alumni
Politicians from Ljubljana
20th-century Slovenian lawyers